A nagar parishad or city council is a form of an urban political unit in India comparable to a municipality. An urban local body that administers with less than 100,000 and more than 20,000 inhabitants is classified as a "nagar palika" or "nagar parishad". Nagar parishad are also a form of local self-government, entrusted with some duties and responsibilities, as enshrined and guided upon by the Constitutional (74th Amendment) Act, 1992.e. g. Kondagaon is Nagar Palika in Bastar division.

Constitution

Each nagar parishad has a committee consisting of a chairman/mayor with ward members. Membership consists of a minimum of 15-20 elected ward members and three nominated members. The N.A.C. members of the nagar parishad are elected from the several wards of the nagar parishad on the basis of adult franchise for a term of five years. There are seats reserved for Scheduled Castes, Scheduled Tribes, backward classes and women. The councillors or ward members chosen by direct election from electoral wards in the nagar parishad.

Administration
The chairman is the head of the Notified Area Committee. The executive officer is the official in charge of the Notified Area Council. Executive officers monitor the implementation of all the programs related to planning and development of the Notified Area Council with the coordination of N.A.C. chairman and all ward members.

Functions of nagar parishad
 Provide essential services and facilities to the urban area.
 Sanitation programme in township.
 Street lighting and providing roads in every wards and main roads of town.
 Water supplying to every wards of urban area.
 Drainage system to clear the solid and liquid wastes from town.
 Build culverts for underground drainage system.
 Maintain the records of births and death.
 Set up and run school urban area.
 Implementation of government schemes smoothly.

Sources of income 
 Taxes on water, pilgrimage, land tax, markets, transport, etc.
 Annual grants from the state government

External links 
 https://mahadma.maharashtra.gov.in/

See also
 Municipal governance in India
 List of municipal corporations in India

References

Local government in India
Hindi words and phrases